The 1993–94 Campionato Sammarinese di Calcio season was the 9th season since its establishment. It was contested by 10 teams, and S.P. Tre Fiori won the championship.

Regular season

Results

Championship playoff

First round
S.P. La Fiorita 3-3 (pen  5-4 ) S.C. Faetano
F.C. Domagnano 3-1 S.S. Murata

Second round
S.C. Faetano 3-1 S.S. Murata
S.P. La Fiorita 1-2 F.C. Domagnano

Third round
S.P. La Fiorita 2-1 S.C. Faetano
F.C. Domagnano 1-1 (pen  3-5 ) S.P. Tre Fiori

Semifinal
S.P. La Fiorita 0-0 (pen  4-2 ) F.C. Domagnano

Final
S.P. Tre Fiori 2-0 S.P. La Fiorita

References
San Marino - List of final tables (RSSSF)

Campionato Sammarinese di Calcio
San Marino
1993–94 in San Marino football